Michael Walker (born 1940) is a Canadian former politician. He was a Toronto, Ontario city councillor from 1982 to 2010.

Walker was the City Councillor for Ward 22 (St. Paul's East) from 1982 to 2010. Ward 22 is bounded on the north by Eglinton Avenue and Broadway Avenue, on the east by Bayview Avenue, on the west by Spadina Avenue, and on the south by Moore Avenue and along the North Toronto Rail Line.

Walker, spurred on by a coalition of neighborhood groups (Federal of North Toronto Residents Associations) vigorously opposed to the development of the Minto Midtown project, which substantially exceeded the existing height and density limits when it was proposed in 2000.

Walker was first elected in the ward in 1982.

He is viewed as an independent and has never sided with the left or right factions on the city council. His reluctance to choose sides has meant that he has rarely been appointed to important city committees. It was not until the 2003 term of office that he was appointed chair of the Administration Committee.

A long-time advocate of campaign finance reform, Walker is also known for having been one of only two Toronto City Councillors who did not accept corporate donations.

Election results

References

External links
Former City Councillor Michael Walker
Official Website

Toronto city councillors
Living people
1941 births